Eupithecia exactata is a moth in the  family Geometridae. It is found in Afghanistan, northern Iran (Shahkuh Mountains), Kyrgyzstan, Tajikistan, Jammu & Kashmir, south-eastern Kazakhstan, north-western China (Xinjiang) and Mongolia. The habitat consists of mountainous areas.

References

Moths described in 1882
exactata
Moths of Asia